The following is a list of FCC-licensed radio stations in the U.S. state of Iowa, which can be sorted by their call signs, frequencies, cities of license, licensees, and programming formats.

List of radio stations

Defunct
 KCBC-FM
 KDIC
 KDRA-LP
 KRNL-FM
 KUCB
 KXGM

References

 
Iowa
Radio